Marsh Island is an island off the coast of southern Louisiana in the United States.

Overview
Marsh Island is an uninhabited low-lying marshy island in Iberia Parish, south coastal Louisiana, lying between Vermilion Bay and the Gulf of Mexico. It is bordered on the south by the Gulf of Mexico and is separated from mainland Louisiana by East Cote Blanche Bay to its east, West Cote Blanche Bay to its north, Vermilion Bay to its northwest, and Southwest Pass to its west.

Vegetation is primarily of the marshy types, and the island is almost treeless. On the island is the Marsh Island Wildlife Refuge, a wild bird sanctuary for species such as the snow goose. Other animals which inhabit the island include alligators, ducks and other waterfowl, crabs, and shrimp. The island is popular for recreational fishing.

References

Webster's New Geographical Dictionary. Springfield, Massachusetts: Merriam-Webster, Inc., 1984. .

External links
Marsh Island at GulfBase.org
Marsh Island Wildlife Refuge at Louisiana Department of Wildlife and Fisheries

Protected areas of Iberia Parish, Louisiana
Islands of Louisiana
Nature reserves in Louisiana
Uninhabited islands of the United States
Landforms of Iberia Parish, Louisiana